Harry Vining Lippiatt (24 December 1917 – 13 December 1997) was an Australian rules footballer who played with Essendon in the Victorian Football League (VFL).

Family
The son of Harry Vining Lippiatt (1892–1984), and Olive Victoria Bertha Lippiatt (1897–1961), née Marshall, Harry Vining Lippiatt was born at Fitzroy North, Victoria on 24 December 1917. His brother Kelvin Sydney "Ken" Lippiatt (1920–2013) played VFL football with Hawthorn. 

He married Brenda Florence Shying (1917–1999), née Herz.

Notes

References
 	
 Maplestone, M., Flying Higher: History of the Essendon Football Club 1872–1996, Essendon Football Club, (Melbourne), 1996.

External links 
		

1917 births
1997 deaths
Australian rules footballers from Melbourne
Essendon Football Club players
People from Fitzroy, Victoria